is a former Japanese volleyball player who played for Toray Arrows. She was served as captain of the team since 2013.  She was also part of the Japanese team that won the bronze medal at the 2012 Summer Olympics.

She was retired from being volleyball player in 2015.

Clubs
 KyotoTachibana high school
 Toray Arrows (2004-2017)

Awards

Individual 
2007-08 V.Premier League - Best6
2008-09 V.Premier League - Best6
2009 58th Kurowashiki All Japan Volleyball Tournament - Best6
2011 Montreux Volley Masters - MVP
2011-12 V.Premier League - Best6.
2013 FIVB Women's World Grand Champions Cup - Best Setter

Team 
2007 Domestic Sports Festival (Volleyball) -  Champion, with Toray Arrows.
2007-2008 Empress's Cup -   Champion, with Toray Arrows.
2007-2008 V.Premier League -  Champion, with Toray Arrows.
2008 Domestic Sports Festival -  Runner-Up, with Toray Arrows.
2008-2009 V.Premier League -  Champion, with Toray Arrows.
2009 Kurowashiki All Japan Volleyball Tournament -  Champion, with Toray Arrows.
2009-2010 V.Premier League -  Champion, with Toray Arrows.
2010 Kurowashiki All Japan Volleyball Tournament -  Champion, with Toray Arrows.
2010-2011 V.Premier League -  Runner-up, with Toray Arrows.
2011-2012 V.Premier League -  Champion, with Toray Arrows.
2012-2013 V.Premier League -  Runner-up, with Toray Arrows.

National team 
2010 World Championship -  Bronze Medal
2011 Montreux Volley Masters -  Champion
2011 4th place in the World Cup in Japan
2012  Bronze Medal in the Olympic Games of London
2013 FIVB Women's World Grand Champions Cup -  Bronze Medal

References

External links
FIVB Biography
Toray Arrows Women's Volleyvall Team Biography

Living people
People from Kyoto Prefecture
1985 births
Volleyball players at the 2012 Summer Olympics
Olympic bronze medalists for Japan
Olympic medalists in volleyball
Japanese women's volleyball players
Medalists at the 2012 Summer Olympics
Olympic volleyball players of Japan